West Wycombe Park, an estate in Buckinghamshire, England, has been as a filming location on many occasions. Productions filmed at West Wycombe Park include:

Television programmes
Daniel Deronda (2002)
Hex
Most Haunted
Trading Treasures
Foyles War - The Hide (2010)
Cranford (2007)
Little Dorrit (2008)
Agatha Christie's Marple - A Pocket Full of Rye (2009)
Downton Abbey
Horrible Histories (2012)
Sense and Sensibility (2008)
Doctor Thorne (2015)
Taboo (2017)
Endeavour (2017)
Howards End (2017)
Patrick Melrose (2018)
The Crown (2019)
Belgravia (2020)
A Very British Scandal (2021)

Films
A Clockwork Orange(1971)
Another Country (1984)
Dead Man's Folly (1986)
Labyrinth (1986)
White Hunter Black Heart (1990)
An Ideal Husband (1999)
The Importance of Being Earnest (2002)
What a Girl Wants (2003)
I Capture the Castle (2003)
The Duchess (2008)
W.E. (2011)
Austenland (2011)
X-Men: First Class (2011)
The Counselor (2012)
Belle (2013)
Summer in February (2013)
Effie Gray (2014)
Mortdecai (2015)
Queen of the Desert (2015)
Pride and Prejudice and Zombies (2016)
Crooked House (2017)
The Hippopotamus (2017)
Fast & Furious: Hobbs & Shaw (2019)

Music videos
Paloma Faith - Picking Up The Pieces

References

External links
Titles with locations including West Wycombe Park at the Internet Movie Database
Paloma Faith - Picking Up The Pieces on YouTube

West Wycombe Park
Films shot at West Wycombe Park